Magdalene Tour (stylised in all caps) is the second concert tour by English singer and songwriter FKA twigs. It promoted her second studio album Magdalene (2019), and began at the Palace Theater in Los Angeles, on May 7, 2019.

Sample setlist
The setlist is from November 6, 2019 concert in Oakland. It does not represent all concerts of the tour.

 "Tap Dance"
 "Hide"
 "Water Me"
 "Pendulum"
 "Figure 8" / "Video Girl"
 "Thousand Eyes"
 "Mary Magdalene"
 "Home With You"
 "Sad Day"
 "Holy Terrain"
 "Daybed"
 "Mirrored Heart"
 "Papi Pacify"
 "Lights On"
 "Two Weeks"
 "Cellophane"

Tour dates

Cancelled shows

References

External links
 Official website

2019 concert tours
Concert tours postponed due to the COVID-19 pandemic